The San Diego State Aztecs softball team is a varsity intercollegiate athletic team representing San Diego State University in college softball. The Aztecs compete in the Mountain West Conference in NCAA Division I and play their home games at the on-campus SDSU Softball Stadium in San Diego, California.

Postseason

Head coaches

References

External links
 

Softball
Mountain West Conference softball